ʿUqdat al-Bakrah, also known incorrectly as Al-Saffah, is an archaeological site in Wadi Ḍank, in the Ad Dhahirah Governorate of northwestern Oman. It is a metal-working site dating to the Early Iron Age.

See also 
 Archaeology of Oman

References

Sources

External links
 http://heidicon.ub.uni-heidelberg.de/pool/oman

Archaeological sites in Oman